Fiqifuliye District is a district in the eastern Sanaag region of Somalia. Its capital lies at Fiqifuliye. Other towns in the district include Ardaa, Kulaal, Awrboogays, Jidali, Sarmaanyo, Damala Hagare, Dib Qarax, Masagan and others.

References

Districts of Somalia
Sanaag